Massagris is a genus of African jumping spiders that was first described by Eugène Louis Simon in 1900.

Species
 it contains seven species, found only in Lesotho and South Africa:
Massagris honesta Wesolowska, 1993 – South Africa
Massagris maculosa Wesołowska & Haddad, 2018 – South Africa
Massagris mirifica Peckham & Peckham, 1903 – South Africa
Massagris mohale Wesolowska & Haddad, 2014 – Lesotho
Massagris natalensis Wesolowska & Haddad, 2009 – South Africa
Massagris schisma Maddison & Zhang, 2006 – South Africa
Massagris separata Wesolowska, 1993 – South Africa

References

Salticidae genera
Salticidae
Spiders of Africa